The 1952 West Virginia gubernatorial election took place on November 4, 1952, to elect the governor of West Virginia. E. H. Hedrick unsuccessfully ran for the Democratic nomination.

Results

Results by county

References

External links
 Democratic primary results
 Republican primary results

1952
gubernatorial
West Virginia
November 1952 events in the United States